Long-armed squid may refer to various long-limbed squid of the suborder Oegopsina:

Bigfin squid, various species of the family Magnapinnidae
Chiroteuthis veranyi, a squid of the family Chiroteuthidae

Animal common name disambiguation pages